Zemlya Georga, or Prince George Land (Zemlya Georga, "George Land"), is the largest island in Franz Josef Land, Arkhangelsk Oblast, Russian Arctic.

Zemlya Georga was named by Frederick George Jackson after Prince George.

Geography

The island has a complex coastline, with many bays, deep inlets and capes. Zemlya Georga has three capes pointing southwestwards on its southern coast: Cape Neale (the westernmost end of the island), Cape Crowther and Cape Grant. Its easternmost cape is known as Mys Murray. The two capes pointing north, Mys Bryusa and Mys Battenberg, are separated from each other by Sommerville Bay. The westernmost cape of this peninsula is Mys Mul'tanovskogo, beyond which lies the sound known as Proliv Arkhangelskiy between Zemlya Georga and Alexandra Land. The sound known as Cambridge Channel (Proliv Kambritch) is located further to the southwest.  There are no permanent inhabitants on the island however there is a seasonal research station which can shelter up to 10 persons.

The Nightingale Channel (Proliv Neytingeyl) runs east of Zemlya Georga, separating it from Bruce Island.

Glaciers
Most of the land lies under large glaciers and ice domes, such as the Brusilov Ice Dome, Gretton Ice Dome, Dzegudze Ice Dome (Купол Дзегудзе), Zander Ice Dome, Foggy Ice Dome (Купол туманный), Arctic Geology Research Institute Ice Dome (Купол Научно-исследовательский институт геологии Арктики) and the Peary Ice Dome, although there is a large, mostly unglacierized peninsula at its northern end, Poluostrov Armitidzh.

Adjacent Islands
 David Island (Ostrovok Davida), lat 80.15 N long 47.33 E, is a small islet located off Zemlya Georga's southwestern point.
 Arthur Island lies north of Zemlya Georga's northernmost end, separated from it by the sound known as Proliv Li-Smita.

History
British explorer Benjamin Leigh Smith, discovered Zemlya Georga in 1880.

The Jackson–Harmsworth expedition established in 1897 that the land discovered by Leigh Smith is composed of two separate islands, the other being today's Alexandra Land.

Image gallery

See also
 List of islands of Russia
 List of glaciers of Russia

References

External links
 
Global Land Ice Measurements from Space Glacier Database
Polar Soviet aviation: Chronology

Islands of Franz Josef Land
Islands of Arkhangelsk Oblast